The Hunger (Al-Go'a, الجوع) is a 1986 Egyptian drama/romance movie, starring Souad Hosni, Yousra and Mahmoud Abdel Aziz.

Plot

The movie, based upon the novel of the same name by Naguib Mahfouz, examines the social conditions of Cairenes during the first decade of the twentieth century.  In doing so, both the movie and novel deal extensively with the themes of poverty and death.

Cast
 Soad Hosni as Zubeida
 Yousra
 Mahmoud Abdel Aziz
 Abdel Aziz Makhyoun
 Hanan Soliman
 Sana’a Younis

See also 
 Egyptian films of the 1980s
 List of Egyptian films of 1986

External links

References

Egyptian romantic drama films
1986 films